Italy competed at the 1991 Mediterranean Games in Athens, Greece.

Medals

Athletics

Men

Women

See also
 Swimming at the 1991 Mediterranean Games
 Volleyball at the 1991 Mediterranean Games
 Water polo at the 1991 Mediterranean Games

References

External links
 Mediterranean Games Athletics results at Gbrathletics.com
 1991 ATHÈNES (GRE) at CIJM web site

Nations at the 1991 Mediterranean Games
1991
Mediterranean Games